The 1985–86 Iowa Hawkeyes men's basketball team represented the University of Iowa as members of the Big Ten Conference. The team was led by third-year head coach George Raveling and played their home games at Carver-Hawkeye Arena. They finished the season 20–12 overall and 10–8 in Big Ten play. The Hawkeyes received an at-large bid to the NCAA tournament as #11 seed in the Midwest Region, losing in the first round to the NC State Wolfpack.

Roster

Schedule/results

|-
!colspan=8| Non-Conference Regular Season
|-

|-
!colspan=8| Big Ten Regular Season
|-

|-
!colspan=8| NCAA tournament

Rankings

References

Iowa Hawkeyes
Iowa
Iowa Hawkeyes men's basketball seasons
Hawkeyes
Hawkeyes